Le Moulin de Daudet is the twenty-seventh album by Klaus Schulze. It was originally released in 1994, and in 2005 was the fourth Schulze album reissued by Revisited Records. Le Moulin de Daudet was released after Schulze's Silver Edition 10-disc CD box set, technically making this album his thirty-seventh. It is the soundtrack to the film of the same name (on the life of Alphonse Daudet). The reissue bonus track is an excerpt from the previously released limited promo CD Ion (2004).

Track listing
All tracks composed by Klaus Schulze.

References

External links
 Le Moulin de Daudet at the official site of Klaus Schulze
 

Klaus Schulze albums
Film soundtracks
1994 soundtrack albums
Alphonse Daudet